Erzsi Pásztor (born Erzsébet Pápay 24 September 1936) is a Hungarian actress. She appeared in more than one hundred films since 1959.

Selected filmography

References

External links 

1936 births
Living people
Hungarian film actresses